The 2021 Rostelecom Cup was the sixth event in the 2021–22 ISU Grand Prix of Figure Skating, a senior-level international invitational competition series. It was held at the Iceberg Skating Palace in Sochi on 26–28 November. Medals were awarded in the disciplines of men's singles, women's singles, pairs, and ice dance. Skaters earned points toward qualifying for the 2021–22 Grand Prix Final.

The event was originally scheduled to be held at its traditional location of Megasport Sport Palace in Moscow, but was relocated in June after the International Ice Hockey Federation adjusted the rink size at the Megasport.

Entries 
The International Skating Union announced the preliminary assignments on 29 June 2021.

Changes to preliminary assignments

Records 

The following new ISU best scores were set during this competition:

Results

Men

Women

Pairs

Ice dance

References

External links 
 Rostelecom Cup at the International Skating Union

2021 Rostelecom Cup
2021 in figure skating
2021 in Russian sport
November 2021 sports events in Russia